The Halls of Eternity is Ancient's fourth full-length release.
The cover-art is airbrushed by Perre, a Flemish airbrush artist.

This is the first album to feature Aphazel, as band's vocalist. He recorded almost the entire album himself, except for drums, female vocals and guest appearance by Jesus Christ! on one song. Jesus Christ! was a member of the band, but he wasn't able to attend the recording process.

Track listing

Personnel
 Aphazel – lead vocals, all guitars, bass and keyboards (except I, Madman)
 Deadly Kristin – female vocals
 Krigse – drums

Guest
 Jesus Christ! – guitar, bass, keyboards and spoken word on I, Madman

1999 albums
Ancient (band) albums